Moncton High School, is a Canadian secondary school in Moncton, New Brunswick and a part of the Anglophone East School District.  The school received the students from the former Moncton High School on January 30, 2015.

See also
 List of schools in New Brunswick
 Anglophone South School District
 Moncton High School (1898)
 Aberdeen Cultural Centre

References

External links
Official School Website
CBC announcement
High School not Ready for September 2014 Opening
CTV walkthrough

High schools in Moncton
Educational institutions established in 2015
2015 establishments in New Brunswick